The Einsatzstab Fähre Ost  (the "Eastern Ferry Operations Staff"), referred to as EFO, was a German naval detachment operated by the Luftwaffe during the Second World War.  It saw action on  Lake Ladoga supporting other Axis units in the Siege of Leningrad.

Background
Following the German invasion of the Soviet Union in June 1941 and the commencement of hostilities between Finland and the USSR (the Continuation War), Lake Ladoga became a battleground when the city of Leningrad came under siege. To operate against Soviet forces around the lake, and against the city's only supply line, the Road of Life, the Finns formed their Ladoga Flotilla, joined in the summer of 1942 by the international Naval Detachment K.

Formation
Between 13 June and 15 August 1942 the Ladoga flotilla was strengthened by the arrival of two German naval contingents: Luftwaffen-Fährenflotillen II and III. These units had been formed in May 1942 at the Belgian port of Antwerp and redesignated Einsatzstab Fähre Ost (EFO) for duty on Lake Ladoga. The battlegroups acted independently but maintained close operational ties with Naval Detachment K. They were made up of twenty-three Siebel ferries (seven heavy artillery types mounting two to four 88 mm guns each; six light artillery types mounting smaller-caliber flak pieces; six transport, six repair, one hospital and one HQ) as well as nine I-Transporters or infantry boats (each capable of carrying 50 fully equipped soldiers). Four of these boats were outfitted as minesweepers; three were kept as transports; one was rigged as a hospital ship and one as an HQ. In addition, one heavy Sturmboot acted as headquarters ship.

The Siebel ferries were originated by aircraft designer Fritz Siebel and intended for use in Germany's planned 1940 invasion of England, Operation Sea Lion. They consisted of two heavy Army bridging pontoons braced together with iron cross-beams and covered by a sturdy wooden deck. The ferries initially had a pair of Ford V-8 truck engines in each aft pontoon end, connected to standard water screws. Further power came from three 600 hp surplus aircraft engines mounted on an elevated scaffolding spanning the rear deck. The aircraft engines, however, were later dispensed with as they consumed considerable fuel and required excessive maintenance. With their low freeboard and wide flat deck, they were easily configured for a variety of purposes.

In all, Oberstleutnant Siebel had a total of 30 vessels with 2400 personnel under his command.

Operations

The EFO suffered losses during a raid to destroy Soviet radio station, lighthouse and coastal artillery emplacement on the strategically important island of Sukho (Suhosaari in Finnish) 37 km from the Southern coast of Ladoga, at the main supply route to Leningrad. The idea of the operation was presented to the Germans by the Finnish Lieutenant General Paavo Talvela. The German-run operation, codenamed Operation Brazil began on 22 October 1942. Though the radio station and the lighthouse were torched and the coastal artillery on the island was destroyed, the landing was eventually repulsed and, in a running battle, the flotilla was harassed by Soviet aircraft, torpedo-boats, and gunboats all the way back to its base along the northern shore of Lake Ladoga. When approaching Sukho island, one light ferry (SF 12) run aground and several other ferries went to assist it. However one of the light ferries (SF 22) was hit by Soviet coastal artillery fire and one heavy (SF 13) and one light ferry (SF 26) that had gone to assist the grounded ferry (SF12) also became grounded despite of the efforts to get them loose. Ultimately, all three had to be abandoned. During the return voyage one heavy ferry (SF 21) had to be scuttled when it started to take in water so badly that they would not have made it back to the base. Infantry boat (I 6) assigned to the ferry was also lost. Losses suffered by the EFO during the raid were heavy. Artillery ferries SF 13 (grounded) and SF 21 (damaged, later scuttled), light artillery ferries SF 12 (grounded) and SF 26 (grounded) and infantry boat I 6—casualties for the naval and landing forces were 18 men dead, 57 wounded, and 4 missing. One of the lost ferries was taken over by the Russians.

Analysis
The operations of the international flotilla were a failure. 
The Siebel ferries of EFO had good armament but they were far too slow and had too short a range for effective operations. They were almost "sitting ducks" to the Soviet patrol boats, gunboats and bombers. As their personnel came from the Luftwaffe, with no sea-going experience, operations in the often harsh weather conditions were extremely difficult.

References

External links
  Luftwaffen-Fährenflotillen
 War on Lake Ladoga 1941–1944

1942 in Finland
Military units and formations of the Luftwaffe in World War II